The FIS Alpine World Ski Championships 2005 were held from January 28 to February 13 in Bormio, Italy. The women's competition was held in neighboring Santa Caterina.

Bormio previously hosted the World Championships in 1985; other host cities in Italy include Cortina d'Ampezzo (1932, 1941 (unofficial), and 1956 (Winter Olympics)), Val Gardena (1970), and Sestriere (1997).

In northern Italy, Bormio is a regular stop on the World Cup circuit, usually for a men's downhill in late December. The Pista Stelvio is among the longest and most challenging downhill courses in the world, with a vertical drop exceeding .

These were the last World Championships to use the traditional combined (K) format (one downhill run and two slalom runs). Starting in 2007, the world championships switched to the "super-combined" (SC) format (one run each of downhill & slalom) for the combined event.  First run on the World Cup circuit in 2005 at Wengen, the "super-combi" format made its debut at the Winter Olympics in 2010.

Men's events

Men's downhill

Date: February 5

Men's super-G

Date: January 29

Men's giant slalom

Date: February 10

Men's slalom

Date: February 12

Men's combination

Date: February 3

Women's events

Women's downhill

Date: February 6

Women's super-G

Date: January 30

Women's giant slalom

Date: February 8

Women's slalom

Date: February 11

Women's combination

Date: February 4

Team event

Nations' team award

Date: February 13

This competition was held for the first time in these world championships. Six athletes of a country, including at least two men and two women, start in a total of four super G and four slalom runs. Each country sends one athlete into each run, men's and women's runs taking turns. The placings of all eight competitions are added and the country with the lowest number wins. If an athlete doesn't finish a run, the country receives 9 points.

Medal table

Course information

References

 FIS-ski.com – results – 2005 World Championships – Bormio/Santa Caterina, Italy
 FIS-ski.com – results – World Championships

FIS Alpine World Ski Championships
2005 in Italian sport
2005
A
Alpine skiing competitions in Italy
January 2005 sports events in Europe
February 2005 sports events in Europe